Skaro is a fictional planet in the British science fiction television series Doctor Who. It was created by the writer Terry Nation as the home planet of the Daleks.

In The Daleks (1963–64), Skaro is described as being the twelfth planet from its sun, while in Genesis of the Daleks (1975) it is stated that Skaro is situated in the "Seventh Galaxy". It is portrayed as having various moons: Flidor, Falkus and Omega Mysterium, with Falkus being presented as an artificial construct created by the Daleks as a last refuge. Falkus and Omega Mysterium are also referenced in the Big Finish Productions I, Davros audio dramas I, Davros: Innocence (2006) and I, Davros: Purity (2006). In Destiny of the Daleks (1979) the Movellans refer to Skaro as D–5–Gamma–Z–Alpha.

Geography

The BBC-licensed The Dalek Book (1964) includes a map entitled "The Dalography of Skaro" on which three continents are shown; Dalazar, Darren and Davius. Dalazar is described as the most habitable part of Skaro, having a subtropical climate and being the location of the Dalek city. To the south-east is the Lake of Mutations and to the south the Drammankins mountain range, which stretches across the entire continent from the east to west coast. To the north-east Dalazar is joined to the continent of Darren by a land bridge. Darren is indicated to be the site of the neutron bomb explosion which transformed the Daleks from their humanoid form into mutants. The north and south regions are separated by the "Radiation Range" mountains. The third continent, Davius, is shown divided into east and west regions by the "River of Whirling Waters", with the eastern region being identified as the home of the Thals. Five seas are shown; the Ocean of Ooze, Sea of Acid, Sea of Rust, Serpent Sea and the land-locked Bottomless Sea. Other major features are the Island of Moving Mountains and an island chain named the Forbidden Islands, both situated in the Ocean of Ooze, and the Island of Gushing Gold located in the Sea of Rust.

The BBC-Licensed The Dalek Outer Space Book (1966) confirms some of these details in a cutaway illustration entitled "The Strata of Skaro". A sea called The Ocean of Death is added, together with the Islands of Mist which, from the description, is an alternative name for the Dalek Book's Forbidden Islands. Further information is added by the 1977 Dalek Annual article "The Dark Side of Skaro", which mentions the Crystal Continent, Serpent Island and a feature called The Rocks, consisting of stone needles projecting thousands of feet high out of the sea and populated by gigantic flying creatures. Other areas listed are a prison colony, a region populated by the mutated descendants of prisoners used in early Dalek neutron weapon tests and The Swamp Lands, described as possibly being a vast, living organism that engulfs and feeds upon anything coming near its surface.

Other Skarosian geographical features are mentioned in the TV21 comic strip The Daleks (1965-1967). In the story "Duel of the Daleks" an acid river and mercury geysers appear. In "Legacy of Yesteryear" a desert area called Tarran, volcanic plains and a northern polar region are portrayed, the latter area stated to have been created when the explosion of the Daleks' neutron bomb shifted the planet on its axis.

The novelisation of Remembrance of the Daleks (1990) states that the Dalek city is called Mensvat Esc-Dalek and is located in the Vekis Nar-Kangji (Plain of Swords). In the computer game Doctor Who Adventure Game "City of the Daleks" (2010) the Dalek city is named Kaalann.

Flora
In most media, Skaro is portrayed as a nuclear wasteland and almost entirely devoid of plant life, with only a petrified forest located close to the Dalek city. Several exceptions are mentioned, however. Varga plants, resembling large, motile cacti studded with poisonous thorns, are seen in Mission to the Unknown (1965). Native to Skaro, they have been deliberately mutated by the Daleks to act as sentries and deter other life forms from interfering with their activities. An individual poisoned by the thorns develops an urge to kill and eventually transforms into another Varga plant. The Arkellis flower is described as being rare and only able to root in metal, with its sap being a constituent of the Golden Emperor Dalek's metallic casing. In the TV21 comic strip The Daleks, dense undergrowth is depicted on several occasions, most notably in the mercury geyser swamps and the mutated forest.

Fauna
The Doctor Who television programme has shown only a few examples of Skaro's native wildlife. In The Daleks, a small, dead reptilian creature with long teeth, a pointed snout and pliable metal skin is discovered, the First Doctor surmising that its body is held together by a magnetic field. This is later identified by a Thal as a "Magnedon". (In the 1965 film Dr. Who and the Daleks, which is based upon The Daleks television serial, this creature is portrayed as a rather larger, petrified, dragon-like animal). A multi-tentacled creature with two luminous eyes is also shown inhabiting the Lake of Mutations. A large, aggressive, tentacled animal called a "Slyther" appears in The Dalek Invasion of Earth (1964). It is described as the Black Dalek’s "pet" and is used to patrol the Dalek mine workings. Giant land-based clams, capable of crushing bone, are seen in Genesis of the Daleks (1975). They are described as being the discarded results of Davros’ genetic experiments. In "Asylum of the Daleks" (2012) a flock of bird-like creatures are seen briefly, flying in the distance above the ruins of the Dalek City.

Other media have introduced additional creatures. The Dalek Book's Dalography of Skaro states that vast serpents, mutated from earthworms by a neutron bomb explosion, live below the surface of the continent of Darren. The book also contains The Dalek Dictionary, which includes entries for "Lallapalange" (an extinct harmony bird which sang with two voices) and "Urvacryl" (a two-headed eel inhabiting the Lake of Mutations). Later, the TV21 "The Daleks" comic strip added giant eels, Terrorkons (large aquatic creatures resembling wingless, two-headed dragons) and amorphous Sand Creatures. The Dalek Outer Space Book contains illustrations of several subterranean creatures including "Sponge People", a "Sucker" (resembling a red beetle), the tentacled Krakis and an unnamed squirrel-like animal. To this can be added yellow and black beetles and "rock leopards", mentioned in the novelisation of Remembrance of the Daleks.

Sapient inhabitants
In the television serial The Daleks two sapient, humanoid species are described as having existed on Skaro; the Dals, teachers and philosophers, and the Thals, a race of warriors. Radiation from a neutronic war caused both species to mutate. By the time of the story, the Thals are a blond-haired caucasian people, their physical mutation having come full circle. They have renounced violence and survive by farming. In contrast, the Dals have evolved into hideous, aggressive, xenophobic creatures which have encased themselves in protective metal shells and rely upon technology for survival. They now refer to themselves as Daleks.

This evolution of the Dalek and Thal races is contradicted in the TV serial Genesis of the Daleks. The story depicts the Dalek progenitors as being a humanoid race called the Kaleds. They have been at war with the Thals for generations, turning Skaro into a wasteland devastated by chemical and nuclear weapons. While the Daleks and Thals have each engineered their own huge, protective dome in which to shelter, the disfigured victims of chemical and radioactive contamination are banished to roam the surface as "mutos". The Kaled scientists realise that the planet's toxic environment will eventually cause the mutation of their species, bringing their genetic purity to an end. Their chief scientist, Davros, decides to accelerate the mutation to find the ultimate Kaled form, in the process "improving" it by removing all traces of conscience, feeling and emotion. The resulting organisms are placed into armoured travel machines and referred to by Davros as Daleks.

The TV Century 21 Dalek comic strip presents a different description of Skaro's sapient life. One race, the Daleks, are depicted as short, blue-skinned, aggressive humanoids. They are engaged in a vicious war against the Thals who, although not shown in the strip, are described as tall, handsome, peaceful and living in constant fear of Dalek attack. The Daleks build a neutron bomb to finally bring the conflict to an end but a meteorite storm detonates the device prematurely, apparently destroying most of the life on Skaro. A mutated Dalek commandeers a prototype war machine, created shortly before the holocaust, to act as a mobile protective casing. It then convinces the last two humanoid Daleks, Yarvelling and Zolfian, to build more casings for the many other mutants which have survived. No further mention of the Thals is made in the strip, the implication being that they all perished in the nuclear conflagration.

The Big Finish Productions I, Davros series of audio plays (2006) places the divergence of the Kaled and Thal species at a point 10 million years prior to the events depicted in Genesis of the Daleks and refers to two other species, the Tharons and the Dals, as both being extinct due to Kaled genocide by the time of the Kaled-Thal war.

Fictional history
The central plot device of the Doctor Who television programme, and of the Whoniverse, is time travel. Coupled with successive programme producers' and scriptwriters' uneven approach to continuity, attempts at imposing a strict chronology upon Skaro's fictional history are problematic.

The events leading to the creation of the Daleks, as depicted in Genesis of the Daleks (1975), apparently pre-date those of The Daleks (1963–64) while in The Evil of the Daleks (1967), the story of which concludes with the apparent destruction of the Daleks due to a civil war on Skaro, the Second Doctor states that this is the creatures' "final end".

In Destiny of the Daleks (1979), set many centuries after the events of Genesis of the Daleks, the Daleks return to an abandoned and still radioactive Skaro to retrieve their creator, Davros. In the subsequent serial Revelation of the Daleks (1985), the Daleks are shown to have re-occupied Skaro; those loyal to the Dalek Supreme travelling from there to capture Davros and destroy his new Dalek army on the planet Necros.

Skaro's final appearance in the classic series is in the story Remembrance of the Daleks (1988), in which the Seventh Doctor tricks Davros and his Imperial Daleks into using a Time Lord device called the Hand of Omega on Skaro's sun to recreate the Gallifreyan time travel experiments. The Doctor sabotages the device, however, causing their sun to turn into a supernova which completely obliterates the planet.

An image of Skaro is shown briefly at the start of the 1996 Doctor Who television movie, the narrative indicating that it is the site of a trial of the Master. No reference to the destruction of the planet is made. An attempt to explain this incongruity is made in the novel War of the Daleks (1997) in which, at the climax of the events portrayed in Remembrance of the Daleks, the Daleks manipulate Davros and the Seventh Doctor into destroying a planet called Antalin which they have terraformed to resemble Skaro and take its place. The novel further places the story Destiny of the Daleks on the disguised Antalin, and not Skaro.

In the revived Doctor Who series, Skaro is referenced by the introduction of the Cult of Skaro in "Doomsday" (2006) and "Daleks in Manhattan" (2007), where the character Dalek Caan states that the planet is "gone... destroyed in a great war". Later, in the episode "Asylum of the Daleks" (2012), the Eleventh Doctor is lured to Skaro briefly. The planet is depicted as having been abandoned once again and is shown with a stormy, rain-swept red sky, the landscape filled with derelict structures and skyscrapers. This is consistent with the appearance of post-Time War Skaro as seen in the downloadable computer game City of the Daleks and an article written by Russell T Davies in the Doctor Who Annual 2006, which states that Skaro was devastated at the end of the Time War.

Skaro appears in "The Magician's Apprentice" and "The Witch's Familiar" (2015), where Davros is shown first as an adolescent lost on a desert battlefield, and then having returned to the planet many years later to die with his "children", the Daleks. The planet has been made invisible and, when questioned by the Doctor, Davros states that the Daleks have rebuilt it.

The Dalek Outer Space Book (1967) contains a chart entitled "The Evolution of Skaro" which traces the development of the planet from its creation, through various geological periods, to the advent of the Daleks.

Other appearances
Skaro is the setting for the feature film Dr. Who and the Daleks (1965), starring Peter Cushing. Although it is not named in the film, it is retroactively identified in its sequel, Daleks' Invasion Earth 2150 A.D. (1966).

Skaro appears in the Big Finish Doctor Who audio stories The Mutant Phase (2000) and Davros (2003), and features prominently in the I, Davros spin-off series (2006), which focuses on Davros' life and the events that led to his creating the Daleks.

Skaro makes an appearance in the Doctor Who: The Adventure Games episode "City of the Daleks". In the narrative the Daleks remove Skaro from the Time War, preventing its destruction. The Eleventh Doctor thwarts the Dalek's plan, negating the planet's survival and restoring the proper timeline. In April 2010 Piers Wenger, executive producer of Doctor Who at the time, stated that the games constitute "episodes" and form part of the Doctor Who universe.

Skaro appears in Daleks!, a five part CGI animated series launched by the BBC on its YouTube channel in November 2020 as part of its multi-platform story, Time Lord Victorious!.

Exterior filming locations
For Genesis of the Daleks exterior scenes supposedly taking place on Skaro were shot at Betchworth Quarry, Surrey and for Destiny of the Daleks at Winspit Quarry, Dorset. In "The Magician's Apprentice" and "The Witch's Familiar", exterior scenes set on Skaro were filmed in Tenerife.

See also

Dalek
Dalek variants
History of the Daleks

References

Bibliography

External links

Skaro Home of the Daleks, article at The Doctor Who Site

Doctor Who planets
Daleks